Roelof ("Olof") Antonius van der Meulen (born 8 November 1968 in Sneek, Friesland) is a retired volleyball player from the Netherlands, who represented his native country in two consecutive Summer Olympics, starting in 1992 in Barcelona, Spain.

After having won the silver medal in 1992, Van der Meulen's finest hour came in 1996, when he won the gold medal in Atlanta, United States with the Dutch Men's Volleyball National Team by defeating Italy in the final (3-2).

References
  Dutch Olympic Committee

1968 births
Living people
Dutch men's volleyball players
Volleyball players at the 1992 Summer Olympics
Volleyball players at the 1996 Summer Olympics
Olympic volleyball players of the Netherlands
Olympic gold medalists for the Netherlands
Olympic silver medalists for the Netherlands
Sportspeople from Friesland
People from Sneek
Olympic medalists in volleyball

Medalists at the 1996 Summer Olympics
Medalists at the 1992 Summer Olympics